State Highway 19 (Odisha) is a state highway of the Indian state of Odisha, connecting Balasore district to Mayurbhanj district through the mejor settlement Nilagiri, Udala and Baripada.

References

State highways in Odisha